Severiano Goiburu Lopetegui (8 November 1906 – 31 July 1982) was a Spanish footballer who played for the Spain national team. He played for many clubs in La Liga, most notably Barcelona. He is known for scoring the decisive goal in the 1929 Spain v England football match.

Club career 
Goiburu spent his entire club career in the Spanish first division, including FC Barcelona for 5 seasons. He moved to the Catalan club from Osasuna for a fee of 25,000 pesetas (150 Euros) in 1929, following the match against England.

International career 
Goiburu made his first appearance for Spain against Hungary on 19 December 1926. On 15 May 1929, Spain played a friendly match against England, who were widely considered to be the best football team at the time. They had previously beaten France and Belgium 4–1 and 5–1 respectively. However, Spain ended up upsetting the Three Lions and won the match 4-3. Goiburu had scored the decisive goal in the 82nd minute to give Spain the victory, despite being the only amateur footballer on the pitch. He won 12 caps and scored 5 goals in total for his national team.

International goals
Scores and results list Spain's goal tally first.

References 

Spanish footballers
1906 births
1986 deaths
Spain international footballers

1982 deaths